Enos Whittaker (1888–1959) was an English footballer who played for Clapton Orient, Exeter City and Stoke.

Career
Whittaker was born in Nelson but began his career with Southern Football League side Exeter City. He joined Stoke in 1912 and played 18 matches for Stoke scoring once in 1912–13 before joining Clapton Orient.

Career statistics

References

English footballers
Stoke City F.C. players
Exeter City F.C. players
Leyton Orient F.C. players
1888 births
1959 deaths
Association football midfielders